Tunnard is a surname. Notable people with the surname include:

 Christopher Tunnard (1910–1979), Canadian-born landscape architect
 John Tunnard (1900–1971), English Modernist designer and painter
 Thomas Tunnard (1918–2012), English cathedral organist